Shammi Akter is a Bangladesh Nationalist Party politician and the former Member of Bangladesh Parliament from a reserved seat.

Early life
Akter was born on 2 November 1973 and she has a M.S.S. degree.

Career
Akter was elected to parliament from reserved seat as a Bangladesh Nationalist Party candidate in 2009.

References

Bangladesh Nationalist Party politicians
Living people
1973 births
Women members of the Jatiya Sangsad
9th Jatiya Sangsad members
21st-century Bangladeshi women politicians
21st-century Bangladeshi politicians